Raivydas Stanys (born 3 February 1987, Rokiškis, Lithuania) is a Lithuanian high jumper. His personal record is 2.31 metres.

He represented Lithuania in 2011 World Championships in Athletics and the 2015 World Championships.

Competition record

References

1987 births
Living people
Lithuanian male high jumpers
Athletes (track and field) at the 2012 Summer Olympics
Olympic athletes of Lithuania
European Athletics Championships medalists
World Athletics Championships athletes for Lithuania
People from Rokiškis
Competitors at the 2011 Summer Universiade
Competitors at the 2013 Summer Universiade
Competitors at the 2015 Summer Universiade